Foolsmate Glacier is a small, heavily crevassed tributary glacier flowing northeast to enter Priestley Glacier,  west of Shafer Peak, in Victoria Land, Antarctica. The name was applied by the Southern Party of the New Zealand Geological Survey Antarctic Expedition, 1962–63.

References 

Glaciers of Victoria Land
Scott Coast